Pickens Hall was a vaudeville venue at Heuvelton in St. Lawrence County, New York.  It was built in 1858 and is a three-story, rectangular stone building, 65 feet wide and 74 feet deep.  It is an Italianate style building with commercial space on the first floor and office/storage rooms on the second floor.  There is a General Store on the first floor, function space on the second, and a newly restored Opera House on the third floor which serves as a venue for various performances.  The $2.75 million restoration project just received an "Excellence in Historic Preservation" award from the Preservation League of NY State.

It is listed on the National Register of Historic Places in 2004.

In 2007 The Heuvelton Historical Association received a $50,000 state grant to restore Pickens Hall which is now open as Pickens General Store.

References

External links
Pickens Hall at American Public Media

Event venues on the National Register of Historic Places in New York (state)
Italianate architecture in New York (state)
Theatres completed in 1858
Buildings and structures in St. Lawrence County, New York
1858 establishments in New York (state)
National Register of Historic Places in St. Lawrence County, New York